Craniospermum is a genus of flowering plants in the family Boraginaceae, native to Kazakhstan, the Altai, Siberia (Buryatiya, Irkutsk, Tuva), Mongolia, and Xinjiang and Inner Mongolia in China. They are tuft-forming biennial or perennial herbs, and are generally highly endemic, thought to be relicts of the hypothesized ancient Mediterranean flora.

Species
Currently accepted species include:

Craniospermum canescens DC.
Craniospermum desertorum Ovczinnikova & A.Korolyuk
Craniospermum mongolicum I.M.Johnst.
Craniospermum pseudotuvinicum Ovczinnikova & A.Korolyuk
Craniospermum subfloccosum Krylov
Craniospermum subvillosum Lehm.
Craniospermum tuvinicum Ovczinnikova

References

Boraginaceae
Boraginaceae genera